North Hills station is a station along the SEPTA Lansdale/Doylestown Line. The station, located in SEPTA Fare Zone 3 at the intersection of Station and Mount Carmel Avenues, includes a 147-space parking lot.  In FY 2013, North Hills station had a weekday average of 202 boardings and 219 alightings.

The station was originally known as Edge Hill and was part of the original North Pennsylvania Railroad route between Philadelphia and Gwynedd Valley, Pennsylvania. Service began over this line on July 2, 1855.

Station layout
North Hills has two low-level side platforms.

References

External links
SEPTA - North Hills Station

SEPTA Regional Rail stations
Former Reading Company stations
Railway stations in Montgomery County, Pennsylvania
Stations on the SEPTA Main Line
Railway stations in the United States opened in 1855
1855 establishments in Pennsylvania